Chasing a Dream (working title Miles From Nowhere) is a made-for-television movie. Filmed in the Ventura County area of California, the movie premiered on Hallmark Channel on April 25, 2009, and stars Andrew Lawrence and Treat Williams.

Most of the school scenes were filmed at John F. Kennedy High School in Granada Hills, California. The logos, mascot (Golden Cougars), uniforms, and signage were all the official items for the school.

Plot
Senior high school football star Cameron is traumatized when his best friend is killed in a car accident that he feels responsible for.  When Cam learns that his best friend (a track star) was working on breaking the sub-four minute mile, he decides to honor his friend’s memory by accomplishing the goal for him.  Cam is met with strong opposition from his football coach and father Gary, who feels he's throwing his sports opportunities away.  The father-son disagreement begins to tear the family apart, but Cam continues to pursue his goal, hoping to put his friend’s memory to rest at last.

Cast
 Treat Williams as Gary Stiles
 Joanna Going as Diane Stiles
 Andrew Lawrence as Cam Stiles
 Kevin Kilner as Lou, the track coach
 Jake McLaughlin as John Van Horn

Filming locations
The track sequences and high school scenes were filmed on location at Royal High School in Simi Valley, California.  Some of the running scenes where Cam jogs along the street were filmed on the street outside the Larry Levinson studios, also located in Simi Valley, California.  The party scene was filmed in the parking lot of the studio.

Critical reception
A reviewer at BlogCritics had mixed feelings about the film. 

Star Magazine gave it 3 stars, saying that "Lawrence and Williams capture the father-son tension" well, and that Lawrence's performance is "moving."  The magazine concludes: "This straightforward drama packs a strong emotional punch."

Most of the school scenes were filmed at John F. Kennedy High School in Granada Hills, California.  The logos, mascot (Golden Cougars), uniforms, and signage were all the official items for the school.

References

External links
 
 Chasing a Dream at Hallmark Channel
 Chasing a Dream at Hallmark Channel's Press Site
Chasing a Dream On Location Behind-the-scenes video
Interview with Writers at RW Racing News

2009 television films
2009 films
Hallmark Channel original films
Films directed by David Burton Morris
2000s English-language films